The Ford Focus Mk 2 is an automobile that was produced by Ford Motor Company from 2005 to 2010. It was launched at the Paris Motor Show on September 25, 2004, as a three and five-door hatchback and an estate, although the new car was previewed, in 4-door saloon form, as the 'Focus Concept' developed by Ford Europe at the Beijing Motor Show in mid-2005.

Design and engineering
The Mk 2, codenamed C307, uses the Ford C1 platform which is shared with the Volvo S40, V50 and C70, Mazda3 and Focus C-Max. Ford calls this platform sharing programme "Global Shared Technologies".

The basic suspension design, which contributed much to the Mk 1's success, was carried over largely unchanged from its predecessor which, along with a 10% stiffer bodyshell, offers a better ride according to Ford. The same body styles as the Mk 1 Focus were offered, though the saloon did not appear until mid-2005.

The Focus Mk 2 is much larger and considerably heavier than its predecessor with a 25 mm (1 in) increase in wheelbase 168 mm (6.6 in) longer. It is 8 mm (0.3 in) taller and 138 mm (5.4 in) wider. As a result, the interior and boot space have increased. New technologies include a KeyFree system, a solar-reflect windshield, adaptive front lighting, Bluetooth hands-free phones and voice control for audio, telephone and climate control systems.

It also features either a Durashift 6-speed manual transmission, Durashift 4-speed automatic transmission, the all-new Durashift advanced manual transmission or just the standard manual.

The perceived build quality and finish of the interior was another important step up from the Mk 1 - an area where the original car was criticized in comparison to the Volkswagen Golf Mk4 which had defined a much higher standard for the class overall.  As a consequence, the Mk 2 featured a padded, soft feel dashboard, damped action for the glovebox, interior grab handles, chrome finish interior door handles, more positive action switchgear, and with better attention paid to material quality and overall finish compared to the Mk 1.

Stylistically, the Mk 2's styling features the same design language found in the Mondeo and Fiesta. Although still recognisable as a Focus the new car uses styling features from the abandoned B-Proposal for the original Focus which never reached production.

Availability
The Focus Mk 2 was also built in Silverton, South Africa for export to Australia and New Zealand. However shortly after launch, Ford New Zealand surrendered its supply to satisfy Australia's high demand, and now receives vehicles from the German factory in Saarlouis. In 2006 the Mk 2 made its debut in the Americas with its launch on the Mexican market as the 4-door saloon or the sporty 3-door in ST trim. The Mk 2 Focus is now available alongside base versions of the Mk I model in some other markets worldwide such as Brazil, Argentina, Chile, Colombia and Venezuela. In Argentina, the Mk 1 Focus was built alongside the Mk 2 in the Pacheco Factory until 2008, and was discontinued in 2010, when the Mk 2 finally replaced it.

In the U.S. and Canada, the Mk 1 Focus was offered in a redesigned form as either a saloon or coupe, the hatchbacks and wagon having been dropped after the 2008 redesign. Sales of the coupe model have been only a small fraction of the previous 3-door hatchback, despite rising sales of the Focus saloon and compact cars in general.

Safety
The new car has gained the best ever Euro NCAP ratings for its class (5 stars for adult protection, 4 of 5 for child protection and 2 of 4 for pedestrian protection) in 2004, beating such contenders as the Vauxhall/Opel Astra and Volkswagen Golf Mk5, including full (16/16) marks for the front impact test.

The Focus in its most basic Latin American configuration received 4 stars for adult occupants and 3 stars for toddlers from Latin NCAP in 2011.

Engines
The engine line up for the Mk 2 is a mixture of old and new. The 1.4 L and 1.6 L all aluminium Zetec-SE (codenamed Sigma) engines from the previous generation Focus were heavily upgraded and renamed Duratec, with the addition of 1.6 L Duratec Ti-VCT engine with variable valve timing. For the South African market, the 1.6L BZ inline-four engine was used in their Mk2. For the 2009 facelift it was replaced by the 1.8 Duratec.

The 1.8 L and 2.0 L Zetec petrol engines of the original were replaced with the Duratec HE.

The Duratorq Diesel engine in 'Tiger' Duratorq 1.6 L  and  editions, 'Lynx' Duratorq 1.8L  diesel carried over from the previous model and the diesel in 2.0 L form rounds off the range in standard Focus guise (this is a different unit to the diesel in the Mondeo).

Petrol
 1.4 L Duratec 80PS
 1.6 L Duratec 100PS
 1.6 L Duratec Ti-VCT 115PS
 1.8 L Duratec HE 125PS
 2.0 L Duratec HE 145PS
 2.5 L Duratec ST turbo I5 225PS
 2.5 L Duratec RS turbo I5 305PS
 2.5 L Duratec RS 500 turbo I5 350PS

Diesel
 1.6 L Duratorq TDCi 90PS, 100PS & 109PS
 1.8 L Duratorq TDCi 115PS
 2.0 L Duratorq TDCi 110PS & 136PS

Specifications for petrol engines

Specifications for diesel engines

Trim levels

The main trim levels of the pre-facelift Focus Mk 2 in the United Kingdom are listed below. For other countries, the range is either a cut down version of this list (e.g., for New Zealand) or it is almost completely different altogether (e.g., for South Africa, which uses trim levels Ambiente, Si and Trend, or Australia, which continues to use the old CL/LX/Zetec/Ghia trim levels)
 Studio (Base model)
 LX (as Studio, adds air-conditioning)
 Style (as LX, adds alloy-style wheel trims, front fog lights and a sports steering wheel)
 Sport (as Style, adds alloy wheels)
 Zetec (as Sport, adds Sport Suspension, sport seats and various interior/exterior styling enhancements)
 Zetec Climate (as Zetec, adds Quikclear heated front windscreen)
 Ghia (adds auto-dimming rear-view mirror, Quikclear heated front windscreen, front fog lights, a number of interior styling enhancements and only model to have cruise control as standard)
 Titanium (adds Sony CD/MP3 player as standard, privacy glass and sports seats)

From September 2006, Ford revised the standard trim specifications slightly, to allow for the introduction of further options called X-Packs.

Brazil 
 GL (2009–2013) (Sigma 1.6 flexfuel 116cv), 5-door hatchback, 4-door sedan.
 GLX (2009–2013) (Sigma 1.6 flexfuel 116cv, Duratec HE 2.0 flexfuel 148cv), 5-door hatchback, 4-door sedan.
 Ghia (2009–2010) (Duratec HE 2.0 flexfuel 148cv), 5-door hatchback, 4-door sedan.
 Titanium (2011–2013) (Duratec HE 2.0 flexfuel 148cv), 5-door hatchback, 4-door sedan.

China 
In the People's Republic of China, the Focus has been built by Chang'an Ford since April 2005. It is available as a five-door hatchback or four-door saloon. Engines are 1.8 and 2.0 petrol.

Argentina

•Trend (2008-2013) Sigma 1.6 110cv, TDCi 1.8 Turbo Diesel. 5-Door Hatchcback. 5 Speed manual transmission

•EXE Trend (2008-2013) Sigma 1.6 110cv, TDCi 1.8 Turbo Diesel. 4-Door Sedan. 5 Speed manual transmission

•Trend Plus (2008-2013) Duratec HE 2.0 140cv, TDCi 1.8 Turbo Diesel. 5-Door Hatchback. 5 Speed manual transmission

•EXE Trend Plus (2008-2013) Duratec HE 2.0 140cv, TDCi 1.8 Turbo Diesel. 4-Door Sedan. 5 Speed manual transmission

•Ghia (2008-2013) Duratec HE 2.0 140cv, TDCi 1.8 Turbo Diesel. 5-Door Hatchback. 5 Speed manual transmission/4 Speed Automatic

•EXE Ghia (2008-2013) Duratec HE 2.0 140cv, TDCi 1.8 Turbo Diesel. 4-Door Sedan. 5 Speed manual transmission/4 Speed Automatic

2008 facelift

LT

A minor facelift of the Mk2 Focus went on sale in Australia, China and South Africa in 2008. Part of the update included a new front bumper that was shared with the Cabriolet/Coupe, integrated indicators into the side mirrors and new style alloys for Zetec and Ghia models. All models also received dual airbags and ABS with EBD standard, as well as the addition of new safety packages which included; front side airbags, curtain airbags, stability & traction control and Emergency Brake Assist.

(Mk2.5 or LV)

Ford unveiled a facelifted Mk2 Ford Focus at the Frankfurt Motor Show in September 2007. Sales began in the United Kingdom in February 2008. Changes include:
 Cosmetically, the facelift brings the Focus in line with the Kinetic Design language seen on the 2007 Ford Mondeo, and 2006 Ford S-MAX & Ford Galaxy, whilst keeping with the general shape of the pre-facelift model. Every exterior panel (except the roof) underwent a reworking with the following key detail changes: trapezoidal grilles, swept back headlamps, bold wheel arches, newly shaped rear glass, a contoured tailgate, new tail lamps, new rear reflector lights, and new rear bumper.
 Greater use of soft-touch plastics in the interior
 Revised instrument binnacle and interior controls, now with red lighting
 New design centre console primarily for the top line Titanium trim and optional Zetec
 Ford PowerShift transmission (similar to Volkswagen's DSG) added to range
 Introduction of a Ford Power Button
 Introduction of a 110PS version of the 2.0 Duratorq TDCi engine.
 Revised trim range consisting of Studio, Style, ECOnetic, Zetec, Titanium, ST – 1, ST – 2 and ST – 3 trims.

Late 2008 saw the introduction of the 'Zetec S' trim, adding a body kit of front and rear spoilers, side skirts and the large roof spoiler from the ST. It includes aluminium pedals, a silver hand brake cover, and an optional WRC pack which adds flag decals and WRC scuff plates.

Prices were similar (if not identical) to that of the pre-facelift Focus (Prices being at least £250 more, the price of stability control as an option on the previous model, now included as standard). This was as its lead at the top of the British car sales charts was cut, by the Vauxhall Astra in the previous years.

Ford collaborated with singer and Strictly Come Dancing Winner Alesha Dixon in January 2008 to create an exclusive special edition remix and video to celebrate the launch of the new Ford Focus.

In June 2009, the Focus Saloon was scrapped in the United Kingdom, and the rest of Western Europe (although it was still available in RHD in South Africa, Ireland & Australia). However, sales continued until 2011 in Continental Europe, Eastern Europe, Russia, China & Taiwan (although produced in LHD). Production ended in 2011, but for some markets, such as Brazil, along with China & Argentina, it was still sold as the Focus Classic or Focus until production ended in 2014, but China still sells it under the name of Focus Classic.

In January 2010, the Focus III Saloon was revealed.

Additional variants

Focus ST

In 2005 Ford unveiled a hot hatch version of the Mk 2 Focus. Called Focus ST, and available in either three or five-door hatchback variant, the car uses the Volvo Modular engine, a turbocharged 2.5 L 5-cylinder engine producing . Ford however rebadged it as the Ford Duratec ST, applied variable valve timing to both camshafts, applied a lighter flywheel and performed a throttle recalibration.

The Ford Focus Mk 2 ST is also known as the XR5 Turbo in the Australian and New Zealand market, but is sold as a five-door hatchback only. The kit consists of: a K&N panel filter, larger intercooler, and a re-map. Although the platform is the same, no saloon version was ever released.

Coupé-Cabriolet

The Focus Coupé-Cabriolet, a two-piece retractable hardtop, was introduced at the Geneva Motor Show in February 2006 and went on sale in October 2006. Originally it was previewed at the 2005 Frankfurt Motor Show. Pininfarina performs final assembly.

In February 2008, Ford revealed a new Focus Coupé-Cabriolet sporting the new 'Kinetic Design' front end of the generic Ford Focus. Notably however, unlike the generic Focus models, the side and rear body panels were not changed, and neither were the door mirrors upgraded to the new-style units, as on the rest of the new Focus models. Nor were bodyside mouldings removed, as with the rest of the Focus range. Some press outlets had expected such changes in line with the rest of the range.

Focus ECOnetic

Shown at the Frankfurt Motor Show in September 2007 as part of the facelifted range, the Focus ECOnetic is an emissions-friendly model, similar to Volkswagen's BlueMotion range, using a 109 PS 1.6 Duratorq TDCi engine with a Diesel Particulate Filter (DPF). Aerodynamic features including low-resistance tyres contribute to  fuel consumption figure with average CO2 emissions of 115g/km.

Focus X Road

The Focus X Road, a Focus Wagon with crossover look which featured a new body kit consisting of revised front and rear bumpers with a matching black finish on the doors and side panels, was introduced at the AutoRAI Amsterdam in April 2009. The X Road was only available in The Netherlands with 1.8 Flexifuel engine and limited to 300 units. However, a month later the X Road also made its debut at the Barcelona International Motor Show and later made its debut in other left-hand drive countries with the regular petrol and diesel engines.

Focus RS Mk 2

On December 17, 2007, Ford of Europe confirmed that a Mk 2 Focus RS would be launched in 2009. The press release also notes that a concept version of the RS is due in mid-2008. Contrary to numerous rumours and speculation the RS was announced by Ford to have a conventional FWD layout with an upgraded Duratec ST engine with 305PS Duratec RS, gearbox, suspension, and LSD. As announced, the Focus RS MK2 hit the road on 5 January 2009.

When Ford completed the production run of the Mk I, Ford of Britain's managing director Paul Thomas said "We always knew Focus RS would be a sales winner, but we could never have predicted its fantastic reception and the effect it had in re-igniting passion for the Ford RS brand."

In 2008, Ford revealed the new Focus RS in "concept" form at the British International Motor Show. The RS uses a modified Volvo-engineered  inline-five engine found in the Focus ST. A new air-to-air intercooler has been developed as a complement, while the forged crankshaft, silicon-aluminum pistons, graphite-coated cylinder bores, a compression ratio of 8.5:1 and variable valve timing also up the power output. The car remains front wheel drive, but to reduce torque steer uses a Quaife Automatic Torque Biasing LSD, and a specially designed MacPherson strut suspension at the front called RevoKnuckle, which provides a lower scrub radius and kingpin offset than traditional designs while avoiding the increased weight and complexity of double wishbone and multi-link suspension setups. Ford UK claim: "It's as close as you'll come to driving a full-spec rally car (Ford Focus RS WRC).
 0-: 5.9 s
 31-: 5.3 s (in 4th gear)
 Top speed: 
 Kilometre from a standstill: 25.4 s (the fastest front wheel drive car in this particular exercise - this time was recorded by the Belgian magazine "Le Moniteur Automobile")

At the rear a large venturi tunnel and a dramatic rear spoiler create a purposeful look.
Focus RS available in three expressive exterior colours: Ultimate Green, Performance Blue and Frozen White.
Focus RS has an exclusive 'Ultimate' Green classic 1970s Ford Le Mans Green of the Ford Escort RS1600 era.

Focus RS 500

The Focus RS500 was launched in April 2010. A limited production run of 500 units (101 of them for Britain) were produced. It has a turbocharged 2.5 L5 petrol engine which produces  and can do 0-62 mph in 5.4 seconds, with a top speed of  making it the fastest Focus yet.

The new model was given the RS500 designation to highlight its strictly limited production run of 500 individually numbered vehicles, all of which were offered for customers to purchase. Each RS500 carries a metal plaque on the centre console, hand-engraved with a unique identification number from 001 to 500.

To provide the RS500 with a fitting power unit, the  turbocharged Duratec RS 2.5-litre engine from the standard Focus RS has been upgraded to deliver significantly more top-end and mid-range power.

The changes include a significantly larger air-to-air intercooler to deliver a cooler, denser charge; a larger air filter box for increased airflow; larger diameter exhaust downpipe; and an uprated fuel pump, along with an updated software calibration to optimise the performance of the revised engine.

Engineered by Performance Car Enthusiasts
The Focus RS500 engine has been modified by a team from Ford TeamRS in partnership with Revolve Technologies, the automotive engineering firm which develops Ford approved performance upgrades through its Mountune Performance brand.

All Focus RS500 vehicles will be painted in a standard Panther Black metallic colour, before being shipped to a dedicated 3M facility near Frankfurt, Germany, where a special film will be applied to the bodywork to create the matte black effect.

Focus BEV 

A prototype Focus battery electric vehicle was demonstrated in August 2008. The variant, sometimes known as the "Focus EV".

The concept car unveiled at the 2009 Frankfurt Motor Show was developed to participate in the UK Government's "Ultra-Low Carbon Vehicles" demonstration initiative in early 2010. A consortium of Ford, Scottish and Southern Energy and University of Strathclyde will use a fleet of 15 Ford Focus BEVs and a charging infrastructure in and around the London Borough of Hillingdon from early 2010. This new BEV demonstration fleet is being developed partly with public funding from the UK Government's Technology Strategy Board (TSB) which promotes innovative industry-led projects that reduce CO2.

As a publicity stunt, the Focus BEV was featured on The Jay Leno Show in a segment called "Green Car Challenge" in which celebrity guests drove the electric car.

Motorsport

The Focus RS WRC is a version built for the BP Ford World Rally Team by Ford and M-Sport, developed to compete in the World Rally Championship. The RS stands for Rallye Sport and the WRC for World Rally Car, the car's FIA specification.

Like all contemporary World Rally Cars, the car is heavily modified from the production version, with which it shares only the basic shape and some parts of the bodyshell. The car features four wheel drive, rather than the front wheel drive of the road car. The engine used in the 2007 Focus WRC is based on Ford's 2.0-litre Duratec from other models in the Focus range as rallying rules do not permit the standard 2.5-litre engine of the Focus ST or road going RS. As with most rally cars, the 2.0-litre engine is heavily modified and performance was increased using a turbocharger. Also the 2009 Ford Focus WRC uses a Ford 1998cc Pipo built l4 Duratec WRC engine (Four Cylinders, 16 Valves, Bore 85 mm and Stroke 88 mm), Pi electronic engine Management system, Garrett Turbocharger (with required 34 mm inlet restrictor), air intercooler, and a catalytic converter.

From the last rally of the 2005 season, Ford campaigned a brand new model, the Focus RS WRC 06, following the launch of the new road-going version of the car. The engine chosen for this Focus was a Duratec motor developed by the French engine specialist Pipo Moteur. The car took twelve world rally wins, starting with the 2006 season opener Monte Carlo Rally in the hands of Marcus Grönholm.

The Focus RS WRC 07 is based on the 2006 model, and according to Ford's technical director Christian Loriaux "the changes on the new car are mainly to save weight and to improve efficiency, driveability and performance at the bottom end of the range." The car debuted very successfully at the 2007 Rally Finland as Ford's Finns Grönholm and Mikko Hirvonen finished in first and second. It later made history at the 2008 Swedish Rally when Jari-Matti Latvala used the car to become youngest-ever driver to win a world rally.

The Focus RS WRC 08 is based on the 2007 model, Ford Focus WRC 08 seen here for the first time with its new front aero design at the Rallye Deutschland 2008 Shakedown. This is the first time Hirvonen and Latvala have driven the 08 car with the new front styling.

The 2008 version of the Focus RS WRC includes design style changes as well as engine improvements. Style changes to the grill area reflect the looks of the recently previewed Focus RS Mk II road sport car.

The rally car Focus RS WRC won four times in 2008 and has 36 WRC victories to its credit since the original model debuted in 1999.

The 2009 actual version of the Focus RS WRC includes small design style changes.

References

External links 

Euro NCAP small family cars
Latin NCAP small family cars
Ford C1 platform
Cars introduced in 2004
2010s cars
Goods manufactured in Germany
Ford Focus
Hatchbacks
Station wagons